David Cummings may refer to:

David Cummings (musician), British musician and scriptwriter
Dave Cummings (born 1940), American porn star
Dave Cummings (entrepreneur), owner and founder of Tradebot and BATS Global Markets
David Cummings (wrestler) (1948–1985), Canadian Olympic wrestler
D. C. Cummings (1861–1942), British trade unionist
David Cummings (athlete) (1894–1987), British athlete
David C. Cummings Jr. (1861–1913), member of the Virginia Senate